Faszcze may refer to the following places:
Faszcze, Gmina Kulesze Kościelne in Podlaskie Voivodeship (north-east Poland)
Faszcze, Gmina Wysokie Mazowieckie in Podlaskie Voivodeship (north-east Poland)
Faszcze, Warmian-Masurian Voivodeship (north Poland)